Phreatosaurus is an extinct genus of basal dinocephalian therapsids.

See also

 List of therapsids

References
 The main groups of non-mammalian synapsids at Mikko's Phylogeny Archive

Dinocephalians
Prehistoric therapsid genera
Fossils of Russia
Fossil taxa described in 1954
Taxa named by Ivan Yefremov